The National Accreditation Authority for Translators and Interpreters Ltd (known as NAATI) is the national standards and certifying body for translators and interpreters in Australia. NAATI's mission, as outlined in the NAATI Constitution, is to set and maintain high national standards in translating and interpreting to enable the existence of a pool of accredited translators and interpreters responsive to the changing needs and demography of the Australian community. The core focus of the company is issuing certification for practitioners who wish to work as translators and interpreters in Australia.

NAATI Certification

NAATI certification provides quality assurance to the consumers of translators and interpreting services and
gives credibility to agencies that engage certified practitioners.

Previous NAATI credentials 
There are some translators and interpreters who decided not to transition to the new certification scheme introduced by NAATI in January 2018.
If there are no transitioned translators and interpreters available, translators and interpreters who hold older NAATI accreditation credentials, starting with the highest old credential, are still available. While these accreditation credentials do not have all the benefits of the new NAATI certification scheme and are not subject to its revalidation requirements, they do remain valid. 
These accreditation credentials are: 
 Senior Conference Interpreter
 Conference Interpreter
 Professional Interpreter
 Professional Translator
 Paraprofessional Interpreter
 Recognition

Those translation and interpreting professionals who opted out of transition to the new certification scheme introduced in 2018 have been accredited by NAATI in the years since NAATI was founded in 1977. They still hold perpetual accreditations not requiring revalidation. Since the certification system was introduced in 2018, practitioners accredited under the previous system who did not transition are not included in the NAATI online directory of credentialed language professionals.

Nil credentialed 
Some interpreters hold none of the credentials outlined above and are referred to by the Translating and Interpreting Service (TIS National) to as ‘Nil credentialed’. This generally occurs in very low demand languages where NAATI offers neither certification nor recognised practising status.

Organisation Structure
NAATI is a not-for-profit company, limited by guarantee, incorporated in Australia under the Corporations Act 2001. The company is owned jointly by the  Commonwealth, State and Territory governments of Australia. and is governed by a Board of Directors, who are appointed by the owners.

The members of NAATI are the nine ministers who are responsible for multicultural affairs and/or citizenship in the Commonwealth, State and Territory governments. Members may appoint a representative to exercise any of their powers in relation to NAATI. These Member Representatives are separate to the NAATI board of directors.

Operational functions
NAATI provides eight key services to assist people to gain and maintain a credential to work as a translator or interpreter in Australia. These services include:

 Testing for NAATI certification
 Credentialed Community Language Test - language ability assessment at a community level, commonly used for immigration points in Australia. 
 Community Language Aide - a test used in the public or private sector which recognises language ability in the workplace for the purpose of gaining a language allowance.
 Skills assessments for migration purposes

There are two types of NAATI credentials – Certification and Recognised Practicing

NAATI certification is an acknowledgement that an individual has demonstrated the ability to meet the professional standards required by the translation and interpreting industry. NAATI assesses practitioners and aspiring translators and interpreters against these standards so that English speaking and non-English speaking Australians can interact effectively with each other.

There are a couple of different ways you can gain NAATI accreditation, including:

NAATI recognition is granted in emerging languages or languages with very low community demand for which NAATI does not offer certification. Recognised Practising Translators or Interpreters meet the minimum experience and ability to interact as translator or interpreter with the Australian community and has recent and regular experience with no defined skill level.

The NAATI Recognised Practicing credential is not offered in languages where there is a pool of certified practitioners or if NAATI offers certification testing on a regular basis for that language,

Outline of NAATI credentials
Under NAATI's current system, there are ten different types of credentials. These are listed in the table below.

NAATI certification for Translator is usually awarded in one of the following directions:

 From a Language other Than English (LOTE) into English; or
 From English into a LOTE; or
 Both directions.

NAATI certification for interpreters is awarded in both directions.

Occasionally, NAATI has awarded a credential in a language combination that does not feature English at the Conference Interpreter or Advanced Translator level e.g. Advanced Translator French to German or Conference Interpreter (Senior) French to/from Russian. This sort of accreditation can only be awarded on the basis of a professional membership of an international association such as AIIC or AITC.

Example of the kind of document needing a NAATI-certified translation
Translations by a NAATI-certified translator are generally required by government authorities for immigration-related official documents, such as:

- Payslips

- Academic Transcripts

- Bank Statements

- Birth Certificates

- Marriage Certificates

- Death Certificates

- Driving Licences

- Divorce Certificates

- Police Checks

- Educational Qualifications

References 

 NAATI website
 Brief explanation of difference between AUSIT and NAATI
 How do I become an Auslan Interpreter (ASLIA)
 Interpreter information (TIS National)
 NAATI CCL Test Practice
 HI-COM article regarding NAATI translations

Translation organizations
Language interpretation
Accreditation organizations
Government-owned companies of Australia